Little Forest is a Japanese manga series.

Little Forest may also refer to:

Entertainment
 Little Forest (film), is a 2018 South Korean drama film
 Little Forest (TV series), is a 2019 South Korean TV series

Animal
 Little forest bat, is a species of vesper bat

Place
 Little Forest Hills, Dallas, is a neighborhood in east Dallas, Texas (USA)
 Little Forest Park, an undeveloped park located in the Washington, D.C. (USA)